Tanneken Sconyncx (1560 – 2 June 1603) was an alleged witch from Gottem in the County of Flanders. Her case is among the most notable of the period in Belgium.

Case
Sconyncx was described as a wealthy, beautiful merchant. She was accused of witchcraft by the bailiff in the city of Deinze, who also performed the arrest. She denied the charges and claimed that the bailiff had made his accusation as revenge because she had refused him sexually. She died during torture after having been tortured day and night without respite from 23 May to 2 June.

Legacy
In 1995 a statue of "the witch of Tielt" was placed on the market square of Tielt, West Flanders.

References

 J. Monballyu, Van hekserij beschuldigd, Heksenprocessen in Vlaanderen tijdens de 16de en 17de eeuw, UGA Kortrijk-Heule, 1996, 128 p. 
 J. Monballyu, "Was Tanneken Sconyncx een heks? Een analyse van haar proces in 1602-1603", De Roede van Tielt, 25:3 (1994), pp. 94–140.

1560 births
1603 deaths
Flemish women
People executed for witchcraft
Incidents of violence against women
Businesspeople of the Habsburg Netherlands
Businesspeople of the Spanish Netherlands
16th-century businesswomen
17th-century businesswomen